The Biotren is an at-grade urban commuter rail system that serves a large part of the city of Concepción, Chile, capital of the region of Bío-Bío, also known as Greater Concepción or Concepción Metropolitan Area, both synonyms of "city" according to the urbanistic standards and laws of Chile, of which this city is the second biggest, most populous and important of the country. Biotren connects the boroughs or comunas of Concepción Centro (downtown borough), Talcahuano, Hualpén, San Pedro de la Paz, Chiguayante and Hualqui. The system is managed by Ferrocarriles Suburbanos de Concepción S.A. (Fesub), which name comes from the former metrorail system of the city and is a subsidiary of Empresa de los Ferrocarriles del Estado (EFE), Chilean State Railways. Biotren is part of the Plan and Authority of Integrated Transit of Concepción, Biovías.

The system was partially inaugurated on 24 November 2005 in a ceremony that counted with the presence of the then President of Chile, Ricardo Lagos.

History 
It began to fully operate in 2006 because during the year 2005 the railroad lines were being upgraded for the new system. The AEL and AES trains that the former system used were replaced by UT-440 MC(Modelo Concepcion) units that were specially upgraded for the city of Valencia, Spain by Renfe.

Architecture 
Biotren stations or Bio Stations have a totally renewed architecture compared to the former system. The platforms have roofs and access for the handicapped. The fare is paid at the entrance and exit of the stations using a prepayment card called Biovías, with a deferred payment system according to the distance travelled. The card's recharge can be made in any station.

Rolling stock 
The Empresa de Los Ferrocarriles del Estado (EFE) invested a total of US $16.800.000 for the trains used in the system.
The current fleet is composed of eight trains UT-440 Modelo Concepción of three wagons each, bought from the Red Nacional de Ferrocarriles Españoles (Spain State Railways, RENFE). The trains are painted orange and have 321 seats (20 folding seats) and a capacity of 590 passengers.

Lines

Line 1 
Line 1: It crosses all Concepción from North to South, from "Mercado" Terminus Station (Port of Talcahuano) to "Hualqui" Terminus Station (Hualqui).

Bio Stations:

 Mercado
 El Arenal
 Hospital Higueras
 Los Cóndores
 Universidad Técnica Federico Santa María
 Lorenzo Arenas
 Concepción
 Chiguayante
 Pedro Medina
 Manquimávida
 Leonera
 Hualqui

Line 2 
Line 2: It crosses the Bío-Bío river on the upgraded Puente Ferroviario (Railroad Bridge) Bío-Bío, the longest of its kind in Chile. The line starts, from downtown to west side, in the "Concepción" Exchange (or Intermodal) Station (Civic District, Concepción Centro) and ends in the "intermodal coronel" Terminus Station (comuna de coronel).

Bio Stations:

 Concepción
 Juan Pablo II
 Diagonal Bío-Bío
 Alborada
 Costa Mar
 El Parque
 Lomas Coloradas
 Cardenal Raúl Silva Henríquez
 Hito Galvarino
 Los Canelos
 Huinca
 Cristo Redentor
 Laguna Quiñenco
 Coronel

Exchange System 
The Exchange or Intermodal Bio Stations have personal bicycle parking lockers for those who arrive by cycle paths (except for El Arenal) to take the Biotren and synchronization with combination buses called Biobuses.

See also 
List of suburban and commuter rail systems
 Metrotrén

References

External links 

 Plan and Authority of Integrated Transit of Concepción, Biovías.
 Subsidiaries of EFE General information about Ferrocarriles Suburbanos de Concepción S.A.

Concepción, Chile
Rapid transit in Chile
Transport in Biobío Region
2005 establishments in Chile